The Gilded Cage is a 1908 oil painting by Irish artist Saint George Hare, one of several of his shackled female images including his more famous The Victory of Faith.

It depicts a lone, sleeping woman shackled by the wrists to a column while butterflies fly past. Its title may have been inspired by the 1900 song "A Bird in a Gilded Cage" and the painting may have symbolic meaning.

According to the National Gallery of Victoria (Australia), "The depiction of naked women in chains seemed to hold a special interest for Hare, and he returned to the subject frequently".

Despite the captive's partial nudity she retains her innocence as her state of being disrobed is forced upon her by her captors rather than being her own choice.

References

1908 paintings
Irish paintings